The 2011 Torneo Internazionale Femminile Antico Tiro a Volo is a professional tennis tournament played on outdoor clay courts. It is part of the 2011 ITF Women's Circuit. It takes place in Rome – Tiro A Volo, Italy between 30 May and 5 June 2011.

WTA entrants

Seeds

 Rankings are as of May 23, 2011.

Other entrants
The following players received wildcards into the singles main draw:
  Aselya Arginbayeva
  Martina Gledacheva
  Giorgia Marchetti
  Marina Shamayko

The following players received entry from the qualifying draw:
  Isabella Holland
  Karin Knapp
  Christina McHale
  Jessica Moore

The following players received entry as a Lucky loser:
  Stefania Chieppa
  Carolina Orsi
  Federica di Sarra
  Sheila Solsona Carcasona

Champions

Singles

 Christina McHale def.  Ekaterina Ivanova, 6–2, 6–4

Doubles

 Sophie Ferguson /  Sally Peers def.  Magda Linette /  Liana Ungur, Walkover

References

External links
 Official website
 ITF search 

Torneo Internazionale Femminile Antico Tiro a Volo
Clay court tennis tournaments
Tennis tournaments in Italy